The first USS Weehawken was a  ironclad monitor in the United States Navy during the American Civil War. She was named after Weehawken, New Jersey.

History
Weehawken was launched on 5 November 1862 at Jersey City, New Jersey by Zeno Secor & Company; sponsored by Ms. Nellie Cornstock; and commissioned on 18 January 1863, Captain John Rodgers in command.

The three vessels encountered gale-force winds and high seas off the New Jersey coast on 20 January. Iroquois and Boardman headed for sheltered waters; but Rodgers pressed on in Weehawken. The Passaic ironclads differed from the original Monitor in having less deck overhang and a rounded lower hull. This enabled Weehawken – unlike her famous prototype – to ride out a heavy sea with relative ease. Rodgers reported that "the behavior of the vessel was easy, buoyant, and indicative of thorough safety." Weehawken put into Norfolk for minor repairs, leaving on 1 February in tow of screw steamer . She arrived at Port Royal on 5 February, and deployed in the blockade off Charleston, South Carolina.

On 7 April, Weehawken led the Union fleet in the first major naval assault against Confederate installations in Charleston harbor. The attack failed miserably, and the fleet withdrew after only 40 minutes. During the action, Weehawken took 59 hits and had a torpedo (naval mine) explode beneath her keel without suffering serious damage. Shortly after the attack, Rear Admiral John A. Dahlgren replaced Rear Admiral Samuel Francis DuPont as commander of the squadron.

After repairs, Weehawken proceeded to Wassaw Sound, Georgia, on 10 June to block the expected sortie of ironclad . The Confederate ram and two escort steamers showed themselves early on the morning of 17 June. Weehawken and  weighed anchor to meet Atlanta which ran hard aground only moments after entering the sound. Weehawken commenced firing at 05:15 and ceased a quarter of an hour later when the Confederate vessel surrendered. With only five shots, Rodgers blew the roof off Atlantas pilothouse and pierced the grounded ram's casemate, putting two gun crews out of action. Capt. Rodgers became a national hero and received commendations from Secretary of the Navy Gideon Welles, President Abraham Lincoln, and Congress. He was promoted to commodore and ordered north to command the new ironclad . Both Weehawken and Atlanta returned to Port Royal.

Weehawken resumed operations against Confederate strongholds in and around Charleston harbor. Despite additional bombardments on 18 and 24 July, the monitors failed to silence the fort, leaving General Gillmore's troops pinned down on the beach caught between a murderous hail of cross fire. Fort Wagner was finally reduced during a naval bombardment of Forts Gregg, Sumter, and Moultrie on 17 August.

Weehawken, Montauk, Nahant, and  now took aim at Fort Sumter, pounding it to rubble during two separate bombardments on 23 August and 1–2 September. Admiral Dahlgren demanded Sumter's surrender on 7 September and ordered Weehawken to deploy in a narrow channel between the fort and Cumming's Point on Morris Island. There, Weehawken grounded, taking concentrated gunfire from Fort Moultrie and Sullivan's and James Island. The vessel was refloated with the help of tugs on 8 September, and received a "Well done!" from Admiral Dahlgren for outstanding defensive gunnery while aground. Weehawken repaired at Port Royal until 4 October, then returned to Charleston for routine patrol duty in the harbor.

The next two months were uneventful, and Weehawken lay anchored off Morris Island during a moderate gale early on the morning of 6 December. Suddenly, the ironclad signalled for assistance and appeared to observers ashore to be sinking. A court of inquiry found that Weehawken had recently taken on a considerable amount of heavy ammunition in her forward compartments. This change excessively reduced her forward freeboard, causing water to rush down an open hawsepipe and hatch during the storm. As the bow sank, and the stern rose, water could not flow aft to the pumps and the vessel foundered.

Four officers and 27 enlisted men drowned aboard Weehawken.

References

Bibliography

Additional technical data from

External links

navsource.org: USS Weehawken
hazegray.org: USS Weehawken
 

Passaic-class monitors
Ships built in New Jersey
1862 ships
Ships of the Union Navy
American Civil War monitors of the United States
Shipwrecks of the Carolina coast
Shipwrecks of the American Civil War
Maritime incidents in December 1863
Weehawken, New Jersey